The 1988 Pacific Coast Athletic Association men's basketball tournament (now known as the Big West Conference men's basketball tournament) was held March 10–13 at The Forum in Inglewood, California. This was the final tournament while the conference was still known as the PCAA; it would change to the Big West for the following season.

Utah State defeated UC Irvine in the final, 86–79, and captured their first PCAA/Big West championship. The fifth-seeded Anteaters upset three-time defending champions UNLV in the semifinal round.

The Aggies, in turn, received an automatic bid to the 1988 NCAA tournament. Fellow PCAA members UNLV and UC Santa Barbara (the Gauchos' first-ever tournament appearance) joined them in the field with at-large bids.

Format
The tournament field expanded beyond eight teams for the first team, with all ten conference members in participation. The ten teams were seeded in the bracket based on regular season record.

The top six seeds were given a bye into the quarterfinal round while the four lowest-seeded teams were placed into the first round.

Bracket

References

Big West Conference men's basketball tournament
Tournament
Pacific Coast Athletic Association men's basketball tournament
Pacific Coast Athletic Association men's basketball tournament